Luke Higham (born 21 October 1996) is an English professional footballer who plays as a left-back for Bamber Bridge.

Playing career
Higham, a former Blackpool season ticket holder, signed his first professional contract at Blackpool in May 2015 after ten years association with the club. He made his first team debut for the "Seasiders" on 6 October, in a 2–1 Football League Trophy victory over Port Vale at Vale Park. He was released by Blackpool in May 2017, along with nine of his teammates. In February 2018, Higham was loaned to FC United of Manchester.

Statistics

References

External links
 
 

Living people
English footballers
Association football fullbacks
Blackpool F.C. players
English Football League players
1996 births
Marine F.C. players
Bamber Bridge F.C. players
Lancaster City F.C. players
F.C. United of Manchester players
Fleetwood Town F.C. players
Nuneaton Borough F.C. players
AFC Telford United players
Expatriate soccer players in Australia